Myo Min Latt (born 20 February 1995) is a Burmese professional footballer who plays as a goalkeeper for Ratchaburi and the Myanmar national team.

International

Honours

Shan United
Myanmar National League: 2017, 2019; runner-up: 2018
General Aung San Shield: 2017; runner-up: 2019

References

1995 births
Living people
Burmese footballers
Myanmar international footballers
Association football goalkeepers
Zeyashwemye F.C. players
Kanbawza F.C. players
Sportspeople from Yangon
Ratchaburi Mitr Phol F.C. players